VfL Wolfsburg started the season in brilliant fashion, taking an early Bundesliga lead, before slipping back in a nightmare run, which saw the team finish in the midfield, with a lower points haul than the previous seasons. Wolfsburg also dropped a bombshell when they signed Argentine starlet Andrés D'Alessandro of River Plate. D'Alessandro had been relatively disappointing season, but Fernando Baiano together with Diego Klimowicz made sure the attack functioned really well.

Players

First-team squad
Squad at end of season

Left club during season

VfL Wolfsburg II

Results

Bundesliga

Top Scorers
  Diego Klimowicz 15
  Fernando Baiano 12
  Martin Petrov 8 (1)
  Miroslav Karhan 5
  Marino Biliškov 3
  Andrés D'Alessandro 3
  Marko Topić 3

References

   RSSSF - Germany 2003/04

VfL Wolfsburg seasons
Wolfsburg